Trysil is a municipality in Innlandet county, Norway. It is located in the traditional district of Østerdalen. The administrative centre of the municipality is the village of Innbygda. Other villages in the municipality include Nybergsund, Østby, and Tørberget.

The  municipality is the 15th largest by area out of the 356 municipalities in Norway. Trysil is the 150th most populous municipality in Norway with a population of 6,603.

General information
On 1 January 1838, the prestegjeld of Trysil was established as a civil municipality (see formannskapsdistrikt law). In 1880, the Osneset area of western Trysil (population: 302) was transferred to the neighboring municipality of Åmot. On 1 January 1911, the northern part of the municipality (population: 291) was separated to join the new Engerdal Municipality. There were also some minor boundary adjustments west of the lake Osensjøen in 1943 and again in 1964 when some areas were transferred from Elverum Municipality to Trysil.

Name
The municipality (originally the parish) is probably named after the old Trysil farm which was most likely the original name of the current  ("the vicarage"), where the first Trysil Church was built. The meaning of the first element is unknown (maybe an old river name) and the last element is sil which means "quiet stretch of a river". Prior to 1906, the name was spelled .

Coat of arms
The coat of arms was granted on 21 October 1991. The arms show two white or silver ski poles on a blue background. It is meant to symbolize Trysil in the past, present, and future since skiing has long been an important way of transportation over the years (including the legend of Trysil-Knut), but has more recently become a major tourist attraction. The arms were designed by Bjørn Ellefsæter.

Churches
The Church of Norway has seven parishes within the municipality of Trysil. It is part of the Sør-Østerdal prosti (deanery) in the Diocese of Hamar.

History
 
One of the first-known, organized ski races was held here 22 January 1862. Roland Huntford, author of Two Planks and a Passion, describes this race as, "the first truly modern ski race." The famous Norwegian skier Halvard Morgedal won all the competitions that year. The Trysilgutten ski club, founded in 1861, is one of the world's oldest ski clubs. See also the Kiandra snow shoe club.

The small village of Nybergsund was bombed by German aviators during World War II on 11 April 1940, when King Haakon VII and Crown Prince Olav were there.

Economy
Farming and logging are traditionally the most important occupations in the municipality, and there are many wood related industries. The Trysilelva river was the last river in Norway with traditional timber floating. There is extensive wildlife, including a large moose population.

Trysilfjellet is the largest winter sports centre in Norway with 65 prepared slopes.

Government
All municipalities in Norway, including Trysil, are responsible for primary education (through 10th grade), outpatient health services, senior citizen services, unemployment and other social services, zoning, economic development, and municipal roads. The municipality is governed by a municipal council of elected representatives, which in turn elects a mayor.  The municipality falls under the Østre Innlandet District Court and the Eidsivating Court of Appeal.

Municipal council
The municipal council  of Trysil is made up of 23 representatives that are elected to four year terms. The party breakdown of the council is as follows:

Mayors
List of the mayors of Trysil:

1838–1839: Paul Irgens Dybdahl
1839–1841: Arne Arnesen
1841–1843: Jo Jonsen Lunde
1843–1845: Paul D. Gleditsch
1845–1847: Halvor E. Lunde 
1847–1853: Ole Nyhuus d.e. 
1853–1859: Halvor Strandvold
1859–1863: Ola Nyhuus d.y.
1863–1867: Johan Landgraff
1867: Albert Balchen
1867–1871: Erik Johnsen Kveen
1871–1875: Johan Landgraff
1875–1879: Hans Nysæter
1879–1881: Johan Rønningen (V)
1881–1889: Per Galaasen (V)
1889–1891: Johan Rønningen (V)
1891–1893: Bernhard Holt (V)
1893–1895: Otto Rundfloen (V)
1895–1898: Johan Rønningen (V)
1899–1901: Bernhard Holt (V)
1902–1904: Martin Nyhuus (V)
1905–1919: Halvor Lunde (Arb.dem.)
1920–1922: Kristian Ingmar Moe (Ap)
1923–1925: John G. Østby (V)
1926–1931: August Aastad (Ap)
1932–1934: John G. Østby (V)
1935–1937: August Aastad (Ap)
1938–1940: Harald Løbak (Ap)
1941–1945: Harald Lunde (NS)
1945–1955: Harald Løbak (Ap)
1956–1963: Engebret Sørli (Ap)
1964–1971: Harald Berget (Ap)
1972–1999: Arvid Nyberg (Ap)
1999–2015: Ole Martin Norderhaug (Ap)
2015–present: Erik Sletten (Sp)

Geography
Trysil is bordered in the north by the municipalities of Engerdal and Rendalen, in the west by Åmot, and in the southwest by Elverum and Våler. The eastern border of the municipality is bordered in the north, east and south by Sweden. The main village in Trysil is Innbygda, which often is referred to as Trysil.

Climate
Trysil has a boreal climate (subarctic climate) (Köppen Dfc) with cold winters and warm summers. The all-time high temperature is  recorded 26 July 2008. Late winter and spring is the driest season while late summer and autumn is wettest season.

Nature
Trysil is a great place to explore the Norwegian nature and participating in various outdoor activities like guided trips, river fishing, dog sledge driving, elk safari, night photography, stargazing. This includes a mountain at Norway's largest ski resort, which offers many of the country's most widely acclaimed downhill and slalom slopes.

Notable residents

 Axel Smith (1744–1823) a Norwegian priest and topographer
 Haakon Nyhuus (1866–1913) a Norwegian librarian and encyclopedist
 Sven Moren (1871–1938) a farmer, poet, playwright, children's writer and politician
 Olaf L. Olsen (1881–1958) an American legislator and politician
 Halvor Floden (1884–1956) a schoolteacher, children's writer, novelist, poet and playwright
 Einar Skjæraasen (1900–1966) an author, poet and political candidate
 Halldis Moren Vesaas (1907–1995) a Norwegian poet, translator and writer of children's books
 Sigmund Moren (1913–1996) a philologist, literary critic, theatre critic and children's writer
 Tormod Haugen (1945–2008) a writer of children's books and translator, winner of the H.C. Andersen prize
 Jan Axel Blomberg (born 1969) a heavy metal drummer, stage name Hellhammer

Sport 
 Karl Magnus Satre (1904–1955) & Paul Ottar Satre (1908–1984) American ski jumpers and cross-country skiers, competed for the US at the 1936 Winter Olympics 
 Kåre Hatten (1908–1983) a cross-country skier, lumberjack and farmer; competed in the 1936 Winter Olympics
 Hallgeir Brenden (1929–2007) a Norwegian cross-country skier and steeplechase runner, twice individual gold medallist at the 1956 and 1960 Winter Olympics and twice team silver medallist at the 1952 and 1956 Winter Olympics
 Johan Sætre (born 1952) a Norwegian former ski jumper
 Anita Moen (born 1967) a Norwegian former cross-country skier, five time medallist at the Winter Olympics, three silvers in 1994, 1998, 2002 and two bronzes in 1998 & 2002
 Jarl-André Storbæk (born 1978) footballer with over 500 club caps and 17 for Norway
 Håvard Storbæk (born 1986) a former footballer with over 300 club caps
 Kim-Rune Hansen (born 1988) professional snowboarder for Burton Snowboards

Sister cities
Trysil has sister city agreements with the following places:
  Sweden: Kil in Värmland County
  Finland: Laihia in Länsi-Suomi

Media gallery

See also
Scandinavian Mountains Airport

References

External links

Municipal fact sheet from Statistics Norway 
Municipal website 
Tourism website

 
Municipalities of Innlandet
Ski areas and resorts in Norway
1838 establishments in Norway